, alternately known as , is a monthly shōnen manga magazine published in Japan by Shogakukan since May 12, 2009 (the June 2009 issue). The magazine was announced in February 2009, with Hayashi Masato, at that time editor of Weekly Shōnen Sunday, editing the monthly magazine as well. Manga artists who debuted new series or stories in the magazine include Yellow Tanabe, Mitsuru Adachi, and Kiyohiko Azuma.

Series
There are currently 24 manga series being serialized in Monthly Shōnen Sunday.

Finished series

2009
 by Kiyohiko Azuma (June–August 2009)
 by Ken Nagai (June 2009–January 2019)
 by Masanori Yoshida (June 2009–December 2010)
 by Pero Sugimoto (June 2009–April 2010)
 by Ahndongshik (June 2009–May 2013)
 by Ashibi Fukui (June 2009–November 2011)
 by Taishi Mori (June 2009–March 2012)
 by Mitsuru Adachi (June 2009–April 2012)
 by Ryō Wada (story) and Mutsumi Banno (art) (June 2009–March 2011)
 by Masahiro Morio (June 2009–May 2010) (moved from Weekly Young Sunday)
 by Hiroo Nakamichi (June 2009–February 2012)
 by Takao Aoyagi (June 2009–September 2013)
 by Haruka Shii (June 2009–August 2015)
 by Tomoyuki Arai (June 2009–November 2011)
 by Kōtarō Takata (July 2009–November 2015)
 by Yūji Yokoyama (August 2009–August 2011)
 by Amiya Harumi (August 2009–May 2010)
 by Koroku Inumura (story) and Maiko Ogawa (art) (September 2009–March 2011)

2010–2014
 by Mitsuru Adachi (November 2010–August 2011) (moved from Weekly Young Sunday)
 by Hirō Nakamichi (April 2013–July 2021)
Les Misérables by Victor Hugo (original novel) and Takahiro Arai (October 2013–June 2016)
 by Yuki Monji and Bandai Namco Entertainment (August 2014–October 2016)

2015–2019
 by Ahndongshik (June 2015–May 2018)
 by Sai Sasano (July 2015–October 2022)
 by Fukurō Izumi and Ryōji Minagawa (January 2016–September 2021)
{{nihongo|[[Re:Creators|Re:Creators One More!]]|Re:CREATORS わんもあ！|Re Kurieitāzu Wan Moa}} by Yūki Kumagai (July–December 2017)
 by Sōichirō Yamamoto (original story) and Yūma Suzu (August 2017–May 2020)
 by Minoru Toyoda (October 2017–August 2020)
 by Q Hayashida (December 2017–October 2018)  (moved from Hibana'')
 by Motomi Minamoto (July 2018–July 2022)
 by Seto Mikumo (September 2018–October 2020)
 by Goka Yajin (November 2018–January 2021)
 by Erika Funamoto (January 2019–April 2021)
 by Yū Saitō (February 2019–April 2021)
 by Riki Taoka (story) and wogura (art) (May 2019–November 2021)
 by Kyukyupon (October 2019–October 2022)
 by Ryota Akisawa (October 2019–July 2021)

2020–present
 by Maiko Ogawa (January 2020–October 2022)
 by Keke Kitaya (April 2020–February 2022)
 by Tsuchitatsu Suzuki (September 2020–January 2022)
 by Yusuke Matsumoto, AK-69 (November 2020–May 2022)
 by Moto Tsujishima (May 2021–July 2022)
 by Nanashi Uematsu and Hiroaki Iwaki (original story) (July 2021–December 2021)
 by Gokayajin (December 2021–August 2022)

Light novels
 written by Hirokatsu Sahara and illustrated by Junji Itō (June 2009–February 2010)
 written by Tōichirō Kujira and illustrated by Hiroto Ōishi (June 2009–May 2010)

Notes

References

External links
 

2009 establishments in Japan
Monthly manga magazines published in Japan
Magazines established in 2009
Shogakukan magazines
Shōnen manga magazines